Džemaludin "Džemal" Hadžiabdić, commonly known as Čorba or Jamal Haji (born 25 July 1953), is a Bosnian professional football manager and former professional footballer who played as a defender.

Playing career

International
He made his debut for Yugoslavia in a September 1974 friendly match against Italy and has earned a total of 20 caps, scoring no goals. His final international was an October 1978 European Championship qualification match  against Romania.

Managerial career 
In August 2015, he was expected to be appointed as head coach of the Iraq national football team, having arrived in the country and expected to attend the unveiling press conference; he departed Iraq a day later.

Managerial Statistics

Honours and achievements

Manager
Al-Gharafa
Qatar Stars League: 1991–92, 1997–98
Emir of Qatar Cup: 1994–95, 1995–96, 1996–97, 1997–98

Al Ain
UAE Pro-League: 2001–02

Al-Wakrah
Qatari Sheikh Jassim Cup: 2004

Al-Dhafra
UAE Federation Cup: 2011–12

References

External links

 
 

1953 births
Living people
Sportspeople from Mostar
Association football midfielders
Bosnia and Herzegovina footballers
Yugoslav footballers
Yugoslavia international footballers
FK Velež Mostar players
Swansea City A.F.C. players
Yugoslav First League players
English Football League players
Yugoslav expatriate footballers
Expatriate footballers in Wales
Yugoslav expatriate sportspeople in Wales
Bosnia and Herzegovina football managers
Al-Gharafa SC managers
Qatar national football team managers
Al Ain FC managers
Al-Wakrah SC managers
Al Shabab Al Arabi Club managers
Qatar SC managers
Al-Sailiya SC managers
Fujairah FC managers
Al Dhafra FC managers
East Riffa Club managers
2000 AFC Asian Cup managers
Bosnia and Herzegovina expatriate football managers
Expatriate football managers in Qatar
Bosnia and Herzegovina expatriate sportspeople in Qatar
Expatriate football managers in the United Arab Emirates
Bosnia and Herzegovina expatriate sportspeople in the United Arab Emirates
Expatriate football managers in Bahrain
Bosnia and Herzegovina expatriate sportspeople in Bahrain